Jeferson Santos Junior (born 19 April 1999) is a Brazilian judoka.

He won a medal at the 2019 World Judo Championships.

References

External links

1999 births
Living people
Brazilian male judoka
Judoka at the 2019 Pan American Games
Pan American Games medalists in judo
Pan American Games bronze medalists for Brazil
Medalists at the 2019 Pan American Games